Simon Mathew (born 17 May 1984) is a Danish pop singer. He is the brother of teen-pop singers Rebekka Mathew and Sabina Mathew. Mathew won the Danish Melodi Grand Prix 2008, and represented Denmark at the Eurovision Song Contest 2008, singing "All Night Long". He placed 15th in the grand final.

Mathew debuted with his first solo album in 2005; an album which became classified as melodic rock. Mathew's first single, "These Arms" stayed in the Danish national hitlist Tjeklisten for 5 consecutive weeks, and sat in the top 3 of the official single sales chart.  Mathew's 2nd single, 'Dreamer" received exposure and support through local Danish radio stations and stayed at number one on the local radio hitlist for a number of weeks.

Discography

Albums
Simon Mathew (2005)
All For Fame (2008)

Singles
"These Arms" (2005) – # 3 in Denmark
"You Are the Music in Me" (2007)
"Illusion" with Ida Corr (2009)

References

External links

Official site
Simon Mathew at MySpace
Simon Mathew International Fansite

Living people
Eurovision Song Contest entrants for Denmark
Eurovision Song Contest entrants of 2008
Dansk Melodi Grand Prix contestants
Dansk Melodi Grand Prix winners
1983 births
People from Hirtshals
21st-century Danish male  singers
Danish people of English descent